Ark Area is a multidirectional scrolling shooter released in arcades by UPL in 1987. The player uses futuristic spacecraft to shoot enemies, collect power-ups, and defeat bosses while advancing through 23 levels. It is the sequel to the arcade game Nova 2001, which was released by Universal in the USA.

Ports 
The game was released on the  PlayStation 4 as part of the Arcade Archives series by the eventual copyright holder for the game, Hamster Corporation.

References

External links
 Ark Area at Arcade History
 

1987 video games
Arcade video games
Arcade-only video games
PlayStation 4 games
Scrolling shooters
UPL Co., Ltd games
Video game sequels
Video games developed in Japan
Hamster Corporation games
Multiplayer and single-player video games
Cooperative video games